Wola Łącka  is a village in the administrative district of Gmina Łąck, within Płock County, Masovian Voivodeship, in central Poland.

History
In the late 19th century, the village had a population of 135.

During the German occupation (World War II), on December 1, 1939, the Germans carried out a massacre of 22 Poles from the nearby town of Gostynin in the local forest, as part of the Intelligenzaktion. Among the victims were mayor Michał Jarmoliński, member of Polish parliament Andrzej Czapski, chiefs of the town's police and fire department, teachers and priests.

References

Villages in Płock County
Massacres of Poles
Nazi war crimes in Poland